Colliers is a city in central South Carolina, United States. Surrounding communities include 2 in surrounding counties of South Carolina and two in Georgia: Augusta, North Augusta, Snead and Edgefield. There are two cemeteries in Colliers: Horn Creek Cemetery and Old Piney Grove Baptist Church Cemetery.

References 

Cities in Edgefield County, South Carolina